Nazluy-ye Jonubi Rural District is in the Central District of Urmia County, West Azerbaijan province, Iran. At the National Census of 2006, its population was 8,350 in 2,357 households. There were 7,538 inhabitants in 2,279 households at the following census of 2011. At the most recent census of 2016, the population of the rural district was 4,549 in 2,427 households. The largest of its 36 villages was Chonqeraluy-e Yekan, with 1,191 people.

References 

Urmia County

Rural Districts of West Azerbaijan Province

Populated places in West Azerbaijan Province

Populated places in Urmia County